Coni is a village and municipality in the Lerik Rayon of Azerbaijan.  It has a population of 421.  The municipality consists of the villages of Coni and Tülü.

References 

Populated places in Lerik District